The Hugs are an American indie pop and psychedelic garage rock band from Portland, Oregon, formed in 2007 by lead singer-songwriter Danny Delegato while attending Cleveland High School. A self-described "pop" band, their music is primarily influenced by the 1960s British Invasion movement and post-punk. The Hugs have self-released seven studio albums.

Early years, signing and splitting with Columbia Records
The band gained recognition after being signed by major label Columbia Records in the United Kingdom and 1965 Records. The band was discovered on MySpace by famous rock photographer Roger Sargent of NME magazine. Label A&R executives Mike Smith alongside 1965 Records founder James Endeacott who first signed The Libertines and The Strokes signed The Hugs together in 2007. The band enjoyed extensive exposure in London, England thanks to a busy English touring schedule and a substantial backing from Sony BMG at the time. In 2008 recording sessions with Liam Watson at Toe Rag Studios in Hackney, London began but the recording sessions of 9 songs were later declined by the label for release. In 2009 The Hugs were released from their recording contract and have been releasing albums independently since.

In 2007 Portland Mercury wrote "Not too long ago, Roger Sargent—one of the two British music industry legends in question—was advised to set up a MySpace page in order to "reach out" to fans of a new photo book he had just published on the Libertines. Sargent's music industry notoriety comes from behind a camera's lens (the Guardian UK called him "The UK's most important music photographer"), as he is known for his portraits of Oasis, Franz Ferdinand, and Bloc Party. Speaking of his first introduction-via-MySpace to the kids from Cleveland High, "I got a somewhat cryptic message from a band calling themselves D&K. It was so annoyingly cryptic I had to check it out. The first song played and I was hooked, but the only thing was, I thought it was some kind of hoax. There was no way this music could be made by school kids."

Regional and national critical acclaim
In 2007 Carl Barât, singer-songwriter of The Libertines, stated in London-based music magazine NME "I love The Hugs from Portland, Oregon. They're kind of like The Libertines but are taking it all from their own direction. They're a band who really know how to put a tune together and I'm totally dead excited about them."

In 2007 NME Magazine wrote "With their swooshing swathes of rainbow rock, The Hugs are further proof that someone’s certainly putting something in the water in Portland, Oregon. Like The Lemonheads but with more primal yelping, the moment when their retro-referencing tunes seem to be veering too much in a pleasant, palatable garage-punk direction, their teeny weeny singer Danny Delegato – the lovechild of Noel Fielding and one of The Monkees – lets go a grave-spinning, throat-slashing screech before indulging in some energetic and muscle-tearing mic-robatics. It’s still early days for the festive shebang, so sadly only a few punters catch the sight of Delegato half-heartedly trashing his guitar at the end of the set. You can almost pinpoint the exact second where he realises he’s going to have to dive into the band’s emergency tour fund to buy a new one. It’s not a pretty sight."

In 2009 acclaimed movie director Gus Van Sant stated in an online New York Post magazine article, "there's a band called The Hugs that I like a lot, they play folk rock, they're a Portland band, I really like their songs.

In 2009 Interview Magazine wrote: "The Hugs are a four-piece rock ’n’ roll band from Portland, Oregon, who recorded their debut album in England. This makes sense because their music sounds British—not “Greensleeves” British, but rather the brand of British that became popular when groups like The Kinks and The Yardbirds invaded America in the mid-’60s with their ramshackle lyrics and bluesy riffs. The Hugs’s music, though, is also very Oregonian, owing an equal debt to home-state forerunners like “Louie Louie” auteurs The Kingsmen and the late-’70s pre-grunge grunge outfit The Wipers. Our woman in Portland, Paige Powell, met up with The Hugs after a practice session, crowding into a beat-up tour van with singer-guitarist Danny Delegato, as well as a bunch of their fans."

In 2007 Portland State University vanguard wrote "The Hugs road to their current breakout status traces back several years to when Delegato and his friend Kelly Mckenzie began writing fuzzy pop songs for performance in the dive-iest of Portland clubs. Playing lousy shows to small audiences, Delegato began to hone his songcraft, and eventually parted from Mckenzie to pursue the formation of what would become The Hugs. Despite their somewhat noxious reputation for having eschewed the norms of the Portland music community, Delegato and crew were devout followers of the tight-knit indie-rock culture."

Portland Mercury writer Mark Lore stated "Danny Delegato has been keeping his psychedelic cruise ship the Hugs afloat since 2007. In 2012, a new version of the Hugs is readying a new LP called Dirty Gems (due out in late June), which carries on the tradition of making psych-pop with a smack of bubblegum. The first single, “Reykjavik,” is a sunny nod to the Icelandic capital. It also shows the Hugs leaving their ramshackle past behind them and veering toward more polished terrain. "

Portland Mercury stated "So, is this local band—who ironically struggle to get even the smallest gig here in town—worth all of this blossoming hype? Well, sort of. The Hugs need work. You can put that NME cover on hold for now, as their rise to stardom will, at best, be a slow and gradual ascent. But under the floppy bangs and slouched teenage shoulders lies a group of kids on the cusp of something great. Much like the early forbearers of the jangly Brit-rock sound, The Hugs have a loose charm, a perfectly content sense of confidence that permeates throughout their sound, no matter how sloppy it might be at the time. Their music has the rough kinetic energy of Slanted and Enchanted-era Pavement, and the haphazard punk of (pre-crack and tabloids) The Libertines."

In 2007 Willamette Week stated " Once they've been given the green light, the band hustles into the venue like a group of thirsty claim-jumpers, untangling cords and hollering impenetrable teen-speak. Each stylistically disparate member looks vaguely like daytime television's idea of a rock-'n'-roll persona: the well-groomed twee kid, the smoking psychedelic kid, the Converse-clad "alternative" kid. Frontman Danny Delegato is the Guns N' Roses-era caricature, his oversized sleeveless shirt and cowboy hat dwarfing his boyish frame. When asked to check his mic, he lets out a howl that dovetails into a squeal. The Hugs' onstage theatrics prove the band has chops to match its natural talent (it's hard to believe these are teenagers), but the members still show their age when it comes to songwriting. I leave the club without remembering any specific song—and hoping The Hugs development doesn't suffer as the band rushes forth to become the next big thing."

Licensing and commercial broadcast success
On August 20, 2011 The Hugs song Delegato wrote titled "Never Gonna Live, Never Going To Die" was featured on ABC Family show The Lying Game.
On December 15, 2011 The Hugs song Delegato wrote titled "In Love" was featured on an online winter Gap Inc. sweater ad.
On August 2, 2012 The Hugs song Delegato wrote titled "In Love" was featured on MTV television show Awkward.
On December 11, 2014 The Hugs song Delegato wrote titled "In Love"  was featured on Slednecks.
On March 18, 2015 The Hugs song Delegato wrote titled "Come Close" was featured on Lena Dunham HBO T.V. show Girls season 4 episode 8.

Current members
Danny Delegato - lead vocals, guitar, songwriter, founder (2007–present)

Discography

2007–2008: The Hugs self-titled debut
In mid-2007, The Hugs were signed to 1965 Records, a subsidiary label of Columbia Records UK, on which they released their debut self-titled The Hugs full-length album in January 2007. The Hugs experimented with vintage recording equipment and a treasure trove of vintage guitars, pedals, and most notable a rare Otari 2' inch tape deck. Producer and engineer Shay Scott adapted 1970's recording techniques using a vintage Neve console and rare 1960's preamps and outboard gear. The album garnered comparisons to The Strokes, The Lemonheads, and The Libertines. Singer Danny Delegato refers to the album's subject matter as "personal sentiments, high school love, and growing into your early twenty's". Tours supporting The Walkmen, The View, The Rascals, The Brian Jonestown Massacre, The Cribs and The Kooks followed the album's release. Receiving critical acclaim by NME, Interview Magazine, and director Gus Van Sant in the New York Post.

2009–2011: Again and Again
The Hugs second album, Again and Again, was released on October 6th, 2009. The album was recorded w/producer and engineer Shay Scott in Portland, Oregon at his home studio "Klickitat Band Camp". Again and Again marked a stylistic departure from the previous album in that it was made up of song demos recorded in England and Europe, namely London and Paris, and contained all songs written while demoing for Columbia Records UK. Singer Danny Delegato cites partying, travel, foreign love, 90's power pop, The Monkees, The Vines and obscure 60's psychedelic pop as inspiration for the album's sound.

2013–2015: Love Led You Here
The Hugs released Love Led You Here, their third studio album, on July 30, 2013. The album marked a further departure in sound from previous releases with a guitar-based arena rock sound, shoegaze soundscapes and programmed beats, drawing inspiration from artists such as Beck, Buddy Holly, Elliott Smith and Oasis.

2016–2018: Feelings of Life
In March 2016, The Hugs released Feelings of Life, the band's fourth studio album, recorded in Portland, Oregon. The band added multi-instrumentalist David Appaloosa on guitar, vocals and producing duties. Feelings of Life marked another big stylistic departure from the previous album, introducing more programmed drums, anthemic hooks, and commercial pop and rock leanings. The tracks were recorded at Map Room Studio in Portland, Oregon and self-produced. Mixing by Sonny Diperri, whose credits include: Trent Reznor, STRFKR, Animal Collective, and Portugal. The Man.

2019–2020: Love You to Death
The Hugs released their 5th studio album, Love You to Death, on April 12th, 2019, arguably the most pop-influenced The Hugs album to date. Tracks like "Who Loved You" and "Mile High Lady" showcase the continued pop, rock n' roll, and 90's garage influence that is woven through the entire The Hugs discography. Willamette Week stated "the Hugs are masters of synthesis who know how to push all the right buttons at all the right times. When your songwriting and production are as airtight as they are here, reinventing the wheel takes a backseat to squeezing as much excitement as possible out of a formula that's been tried and true for decades." The Album was engineered and co-produced by Brandon Egglesston at The Dandy Warhols warehouse studio "The Oddy" in Portland, Oregon. With additional mixing by Sonny Diperri. Tours supporting The Kooks, Finn Wolfhard of Calpurnia and The Dandy Warhols followed the albums release.

2021: Dirty Gems LP (Reissue)
On December 7th, 2021, The Hugs announced a reissue and 6th studio album Dirty Gems. Alongside the release of its first two singles, "Dot Dot" and "Reykjavik". The album was produced, mixed and engineered by long-time producer Shay Scott in Portland, Oregon. Drawing inspiration from guitar bands such as The Strokes, Television, and Modest Mouse.

2022–present: True to Your Own Spirit
On June 3rd, 2022, The Hugs announced their seventh studio album, True to Your Own Spirit. Alongside the release of its first two singles, "Singing Out My Window" and "In the Dead Black Night". Two more singles, "Sad Place" and "Witness", were released that year respectively. The album was mixed by producer Gordon Raphael in Hebden Bridge, England. Drawing inspiration from modern pop and under the current lo-fi indie artists such as Mac DeMarco, The La's, and Swim Deep.

Albums and EPs
 "The Hugs" (Self Titled)  (7 May 2007)
 "Again And Again" (6 October 2009)
 "Love Led You Here" (30 July 2013)
 "Feelings of Life" (25 March 2016)
 "Love You To Death" (12 April 2019)
 "Dirty Gems" (10 December 2021)
 "True To Your Own Spirit" (3 June 2022)

Singles
 "North" (9 March 2007)
 "Palm Trees" (15 June 2007)
 "She Was High" (3 August 2009)
 "Ego's" (9 November 2009) 
 "Reykjavik" (5 July 2012)
 "Dot Dot" (7 August 2012)
 "Magnify" (2 July 2013)
 "Let It Go" (12 November 2013)
 "Wherever You Go" (7 January 2016)
 "Story Books" (15 September 2016)
 "Tunnel" (14 April 2017)
 "Fearless" (3 November 2017)
 "Want You Now" (26 December 2017)
 "Mile High Lady" (18 March 2019)
 "Love You To Death" (1 September 2019)
 "Friends Can Break Your Heart" (19 June 2020)
 "Future Nostalgia" (27 November 2020)
 "On And On" (4 May 2021)
 "In The Dead Black Night" (21 May 2021)
 "Où Tu Sais" (11 June 2021)
 "Singing Out My Window" (16 July 2021)
 "Great Bolongo Beat" (21 August 2021)
 "Witness" (24 September 2021)
 "Strangers Lost" (26 January 2022)
 "Sad Place" " (2 June 2022)

References

Indie pop groups from Oregon
Musical groups from Portland, Oregon
2007 establishments in Oregon
Musical groups established in 2007
Sony BMG artists
Columbia Records artists